San Ignacio Department is a department in Misiones Province, Argentina.

Departments of Misiones Province